The 42nd Academy Awards were presented April 7, 1970, at the Dorothy Chandler Pavilion in Los Angeles, California.  For the second year in a row, there was no official host. This was the first Academy Awards ceremony to be broadcast via satellite to an international audience, though outside North America, Mexico and Brazil were the only countries to broadcast the event live.

One year after Oliver! became the only G-rated film won Best Picture, Midnight Cowboy became the first and only X-rated film to win, though its rating was changed in 1971 to R after the MPAA revised its ratings criteria. Only one other X-rated film has been nominated for Best Picture since, Stanley Kubrick's A Clockwork Orange (1971), which was also subsequently downgraded to an R rating (though this was a result of cuts to the original film).

They Shoot Horses, Don't They? set an Oscar record by receiving nine nominations without one for Best Picture. This was the last time until the 68th Academy Awards wherein none of the four winning performances came from Best Picture nominated films, as well as the first time where every acting nomination was in color.

The ceremony
This was the first Academy Award ceremony intended to be broadcast via satellite worldwide, but according to Klaus Lehmann, a foreign sales executive of the ABC television network, in addition to Canada and Mexico (broadcasting the event since 1953, but only live since 1964), only two South American countries, Chile and Brazil, roughly in the Oscars' time zone, were interested in the live coverage. The Chilean television rights to the Oscars were sold by ABC International to Televisión Nacional de Chile while the Brazilian rights were sold to TV Tupi. The latter country's rights to the TV broadcast of the Oscars were moved to a joint venture of TV Bandeirantes and TV Record. Starting in 1974, the Brazilian TV rights to the Oscars were sold by NBC (which had acquired the TV rights to the Awards from ABC to be broadcast for a five-year period until 1975, when they returned to ABC for the next year's Awards) to Rede Globo. An early attempt to change the Academy Awards presentation's start time to 1 p.m. to fit European television audiences was rejected by AMPAS executives. Since at the time television standards conversion was difficult, about 50 other countries did not broadcast the event live. In Europe, most TV broadcasters signed off at midnight, thus the Oscars were not broadcast live and were recorded on film and then shipped to broadcasters with a minimum four-day delay from the awards' broadcast date.

In terms of performances, in-between presenting the documentary awards, Bob Hope and Fred Astaire discussed how Astaire had never danced on the Academy Awards broadcast before, with Astaire claiming to have "given it [dancing] up" the previous year. Cuing the orchestra, Hope then left the stage as Astaire began a impromptu dance performance, first in a modern jazz style before ending with traditional tap dancing (this would not be Astaire's final dance performance as he would later dance in the film That's Entertainment, Part II six years later)

Winners and nominees

Nominees were announced on February 16, 1970. Winners are listed first, highlighted in boldface and indicated with a double dagger.

Academy Honorary Award 

 Cary Grant

Jean Hersholt Humanitarian Award 

 George Jessel

Multiple nominations and awards

These films had multiple nominations:
10 nominations: Anne of the Thousand Days 
9 nominations: They Shoot Horses, Don't They?
7 nominations: Butch Cassidy and the Sundance Kid, Hello, Dolly! and Midnight Cowboy
5 nominations: Z
4 nominations: Bob & Carol & Ted & Alice
3 nominations: Gaily, Gaily, Marooned and Sweet Charity
2 nominations: Easy Rider, Goodbye, Mr. Chips, The Happy Ending, The Magic Machines, The Prime of Miss Jean Brodie, The Reivers, The Secret of Santa Vittoria, The Sterile Cuckoo, True Grit and The Wild Bunch

The following films received multiple awards.
4 wins: Butch Cassidy and the Sundance Kid
3 wins: Hello, Dolly! and Midnight Cowboy
2 wins: Z

Presenters and performers
Fred Astaire (Presenter: Best Supporting Actress and Documentary Awards)
Candice Bergen (Presenter: Best Sound, Best Costume Design and Best Song Original for the Picture)
Elmer Bernstein (Presenter: Best Original Score for a Musical Picture Original or Adaptation)
Claudia Cardinale (Presenter: Best Film Editing and Best Foreign Language Film)
Clint Eastwood (Presenter: Best Foreign Language Film)
Elliott Gould (Presenter: Best Sound)
Bob Hope (Presenter: Jean Hersholt Humanitarian Award and Documentary Awards)
James Earl Jones (Presenter: Best Film Editing and Best Story and Screenplay Based on Factual Material or Material Not Previously Published or Produced)
Myrna Loy (Presenter: Best Short Subjects, Best Art Direction and Best Director)
Ali MacGraw (Presenter: Best Story and Screenplay Based on Factual Material or Material Not Previously Published or Produced)
Barbara McNair (Presenter: Best Original Score for a Motion Picture (Non-Musical))
Cliff Robertson (Presenter: Best Actress, Best Original Score for a Motion Picture (Not a Musical) & Short Subjects Awards)
Katharine Ross (Presenter: Best Supporting Actor and Best Screenplay Based on Material from Another Medium)
Frank Sinatra (Presenter: Honorary Award to Cary Grant)
Barbra Streisand (Presenter: Best Actor)
Elizabeth Taylor (Presenter: Best Picture)
Jon Voight (Presenter: Best Art Direction and Best Screenplay Based on Material from Another Medium)
Shani Wallis (Presenter: Best Original Score for a Musical Picture Original or Adaptation)
John Wayne (Presenter: Best Cinematography)
Raquel Welch (Presenter: Best Special Visual Effects)

Performers
Glen Campbell ("True Grit" from True Grit)
Michel Legrand ("What Are You Doing the Rest of Your Life?" from The Happy Ending)
Lou Rawls ("Jean" from The Prime of Miss Jean Brodie)
The Sandpipers ("Come Saturday Morning" from The Sterile Cuckoo)
B. J. Thomas ("Raindrops Keep Fallin' on My Head" from Butch Cassidy and the Sundance Kid)
Fred Astaire (untitled dance in-between presentation of the two documentary awards)

See also 
 List of most watched television broadcasts
 27th Golden Globe Awards
 1969 in film
 12th Grammy Awards
 21st Primetime Emmy Awards
 22nd Primetime Emmy Awards
 23rd British Academy Film Awards
 24th Tony Awards

References

Academy Awards ceremonies
1969 film awards
1969 awards in the United States
1970 in Los Angeles
Television shows directed by Jack Haley Jr.
1970 in American cinema
April 1970 events in the United States